Cerov Log is a small settlement in the Gorjanci Hills in the Municipality of Šentjernej in southeastern Slovenia. Its territory extends right to the border with Croatia. The area is part of the traditional region of Lower Carniola. It is now included in the Southeast Slovenia Statistical Region.

There is a 16th-century three-storey mansion south of the settlement known as Prežek Castle. In the 1830s it was owned for a while by Andrej Smole, a collector of Slovene folk songs and friend of the poet France Prešeren.

References

External links

Cerov Log on Geopedia

Populated places in the Municipality of Šentjernej